The National Order of the Lion is the highest order of Senegal.

The order was instituted by Law 60-36 of 22 October 1960, later modified by Law 62-416 of 11 July 1962, and by Law 64-06 of 24 January 1964. It is awarded for distinguished contributions, both civil and military. Because the National Order of the Lion is awarded only sparingly to keep it in high esteem, the other order was established to recognize contributions that would otherwise be neglected.

The President of Senegal is the Grand Master of the order and chairs the Council of the Order composed of ten people. The Grand Chancellery of the order is under the Protocol Division of the Cabinet of Senegal. The Grand Chancellor is counter admiral . The insignia, manufactured by Arthus-Bertrand in Paris, bear the words  ("Republic of Senegal") and the Senegalese national motto in French:  ("One People, One Goal, One Faith"). The ribbon is green. The start of the order is featured in the coat of arms of Senegal.

Ranks

The order has the following five classes: Grand Cross (grand-croix), Grand Officer (grand officier), Commander (commandeur), Officer (officier), and Knight (chevalier). Membership in the order is limited to 25 Grand Crosses, 100 Grand Officers, 200 Commanders, 1,000 Officers, and 5,000 Knights, not including foreign members.

Recipients

 Grand Crosses
 Akihito
 Albert II, Prince of Monaco
 Emmanuel Macron
 Hamad bin Khalifa Al Thani
 Henri, Grand Duke of Luxembourg
 Jean-Bédel Bokassa
 Juan Carlos I
 Kim Jong-il
 Macky Sall
 Pieter van Vollenhoven
 Princess Margriet of the Netherlands
 Recep Tayyip Erdoğan
 Tarja Halonen
 Xi Jinping
 Grand Officers
 Aga Khan IV
 Juliette Bonkoungou
 Salim Ahmed Salim
 Commanders
 Julius E. Coles
 Jean-Philippe Douin
 Pierre Joxe
 Jacques Paul Klein
 Jacques Lanxade
 François Lecointre
 Frédéric Luz
 Jean Miot
 Ndioro Ndiaye
 Benoît Puga
 Jean-Christophe Rufin
 Torild Skard
 Pierre de Villiers
 Didier Raoult
 Knights
 Germaine Acogny
 Mbaye Diagne
 Esther Kamatari
 Ahmadou Lamine Ndiaye
 Aminata Sow Fall
Papa Abdoulaye Seck

See also
 Orders, decorations, and medals of Senegal

References

Further reading

External links

 National orders at the Presidency of Senegal
 Les communiqués de la Présidence de la République du Sénégal 
 Journal officiel de la République du Sénégal 

Orders, decorations, and medals of Senegal